Circles of Deceit is a British television thriller series, produced by Yorkshire Television, first broadcast on ITV on 16 October 1993. The series stars Dennis Waterman as John Neil, a former serving officer in the Special Air Service, who works as a private investigator for the secret service. A total of four episodes were broadcast, including a single feature-length self-titled pilot in 1993, and a series of three episodes, filmed in 1995, and broadcast between 1995 and 1996. Although broadcast as the final episode of the series, Sleeping Dogs is set chronologically after the events of the self-titled pilot (which was re-titled The Wolves are Howling for disambiguation reasons on repeat broadcasts and home video release).
 
Aside from Neil, the only other character to appear in all four films was the Controller. In the pilot, this role was assumed by Derek Jacobi (under the pseudonym of Randal). For the series, Jacobi was replaced by Susan Jameson. The only other recurring character throughout the series was Andy, a wheelchair-using researcher and collator, played by Dave Hill. A VHS video of the self-titled pilot was released in the United States in 1994. The complete series was later released on Region 1 DVD in the United States by Acorn Media on 17 May 2011. On 23 April 2018, nearly twenty-five years after the broadcast of the self-titled pilot, the complete series was released on Region 2 DVD in the United Kingdom by Strawberry Media.

Cast

 Dennis Waterman as John Neil
 Derek Jacobi as Controller aka 'Randal' (1.1)
 Susan Jameson as Controller (2.1 — 2.3)
 Dave Hill as Andy (2.1 — 2.3)

The Wolves are Howling
 Peter Vaughan as Liam McAuley
 Clare Higgins as Eilish
 Ian McElhinney as Father Fergal
 Tony Doyle as Graham
 Colum Convey as Dessie Gill
 Gerard Crossan as Colum McAuley
 Andrew Connolly as Dermot McAuley

Sleeping Dogs
 Leo McKern as Alexander Petrov
 Frances Barber as Annie Shepherd
 Paul Freeman as Armitage
 Nicholas Jones as Schroeder
 Bill Armstrong as Bill Roper 
 Lalor Roddy as Mark Grady
 Ian Fitzgibbon as Tony Lynch
 James Aubrey as George Grant

Dark Secret
 Corin Redgrave as Harry Summers
 Kate Buffery as Kate Moore
 Pippa Guard as Elizabeth Ferrer
 Melanie Hill as Angie Norman
 Holly Aird as Sarah Ellis
 Sean McGinley as Jim Caine
 Adjoa Andoh as Daniela
 Joe Montana as Travis
 Peter Birch as Stefan

Kalon
 Simon Cadell as Brendan Rylands
 Saskia Wickham as Liz Baker
 John Hannah as Jason Sturden
 Struan Rodger as Alec Dwyer
 Sean Gilder as Tarleton
 John Hartley as Francis
 Constantine Gregory as Paric
 Jack Klaff as Osuna
 Tony Armatrading as Lawrence

Episodes

Pilot (1993)

Series (1995—1996)

References

External links
 
 
 
 

1993 television films
1993 films
1993 British television series debuts
1996 British television series endings
1990s British drama television series
ITV television dramas
1990s British crime television series
Television series by ITV Studios
Television series by Yorkshire Television
English-language television shows